Presidential elections were held in Chad on 2 June 1996, with a second round on 3 July. They were the first multiparty presidential elections in the history of Chad and occurred at the end of a long transitional process after repeated delays. The elections were won by the incumbent President Idriss Déby, who easily defeated a prominent southern politician, Wadel Abdelkader Kamougué, in the second round. Déby benefited from the support of another southern politician, Saleh Kebzabo, who was placed third in the first round. The election was marred by widespread and credible reports of electoral fraud and government intimidation of opposition forces, confirmed by international observers. Voter turnout was 67.5% in the first round and 77.7% in the second.

Following his victory, Déby was sworn in on 8 August 1996.

Results

References

Presidential elections in Chad
Presidential election
Chad
Chadian presidential election
Chadian presidential election